Tyrannochromis macrostoma, or big-mouth hap, is a species of cichlid endemic to Lake Malawi where it prefers rocky shallows.  This species can reach a length of  TL.  It can also be found in the aquarium trade.

See also
List of freshwater aquarium fish species

References

External links
 Photograph

macrostoma
Taxa named by Charles Tate Regan
Fish described in 1922
Taxonomy articles created by Polbot